54 Gauhati West LAC Assembly constituency is one of the 126 assembly constituencies of  Assam a north east state of India.  Guwahati West is also part of Gauhati Lok Sabha constituency.

Members of Legislative Assembly

 1967: Govinda Kalita, Communist Party of India
 1972: Biren Ram Phookun, Indian National Congress
 1978: Kiran Chandra Bezbarua, Janata Party
 1983: Tarini Kanta Boro, Indian National Congress
 1985: Ramendra Narayan Kalita, Independent
 1991: Ramendra Narayan Kalita, Natun Asom Gana Parishad
 1996: Ramendra Narayan Kalita, Asom Gana Parishad
 2001: Hemanta Talukdar, Indian National Congress
 2006: Ramendra Narayan Kalita, Asom Gana Parishad
 2011: Hementa Talukdar, Indian National Congress
 2016: Ramendra Narayan Kalita, Asom Gana Parishad
2021: Ramendra Narayan Kalita  Asom Gana Parishad

Election results

2016 results

2011 results

See also
 Guwahati
 List of constituencies of Assam Legislative Assembly

References

External links 
 

Assembly constituencies of Assam
 
Guwahati